Alexander Denton (14 August 1679 – 22 March 1740)  was a British lawyer and politician who sat in the House of Commons between 1708 and 1722 and in the Irish House of Commons from 1709 to 1715.

Denton was the second son of Alexander Denton and his wife Hester Herman, daughter of Nicholas Herman of Middleton Stoney, Oxfordshire. He was educated at Buckingham in 1694 and matriculated at St Edmund Hall, Oxford in 1697. He was admitted at Middle Temple in 1698 and called to the bar in 1704.   His father, Alexander Denton, was also a Member of Parliament (MP) representing Buckingham, from 1690 to 1698. He was the younger brother of Sir Edmund Denton.

Denton  was returned as Member of Parliament (MP) for Buckingham at the 1708 general election. He also sat in the Irish House of Commons for Carrickfergus from 1709 to 1713. At the 1715 general election he was returned as MP for Buckingham again. He became a Bencher of Middle Temple in 1720 and in 1722 after being returned as MP again he gave up his seat in Parliament on being appointed Justice of the Common Pleas and remained as such until his death.

Denton made a financially advantageous marriage on 3 March 1716 to Catherine Bond, daughter of John Bond of Sundridge, Kent. She died in 1733 and he died on 22 March 1740. He was childless, as was his brother and so his property descended to his nephew George Chamberlayne.

References

1679 births
1740 deaths
British MPs 1708–1710
British MPs 1715–1722
Justices of the Common Pleas
Members of the Parliament of Great Britain for English constituencies
Irish MPs 1703–1713
Members of the Parliament of Ireland (pre-1801) for County Antrim constituencies